Spoon and Rafter is the fourth album by the British country rock-folk group Mojave 3, released on 22 September 2003 in the UK, and a day later in the US. It was received to generally positive reviews, averaging a 76 on Metacritic. The songs "Billoddity" and "Bluebird of Happiness" were featured in two episodes of The O.C. ("The Heartbreak" and "The Telenovela" respectively).

Track listing
 "Bluebird of Happiness" – 9:16
 "Starlite #1" – 4:56
 "Billoddity" – 4:18
 "Writing to St. Peter" – 5:58
 "Battle of the Broken Hearts" – 6:38
 "Hard to Miss You" – 2:50
 "Tinkers Blues" – 5:09
 "She's All Up Above" – 3:38
 "Too Many Mornings" – 3:16
 "Between the Bars" – 5:02

References

2003 albums
Mojave 3 albums
4AD albums